Lakhshmi Kant Pandey (born 1936) is an Indian wrestler. He competed in the men's freestyle lightweight at the 1956 Summer Olympics.

References

External links
 

1936 births
Living people
Indian male sport wrestlers
Olympic wrestlers of India
Wrestlers at the 1956 Summer Olympics
Place of birth missing (living people)
Asian Games medalists in wrestling
Wrestlers at the 1962 Asian Games
Medalists at the 1962 Asian Games
Asian Games bronze medalists for India
Commonwealth Games medallists in wrestling
Commonwealth Games silver medallists for India
Wrestlers at the 1958 British Empire and Commonwealth Games
Medallists at the 1958 British Empire and Commonwealth Games